The canton of La Charité-sur-Loire is an administrative division of the Nièvre department, central France. Its borders were modified at the French canton reorganisation which came into effect in March 2015. Its seat is in La Charité-sur-Loire.

It consists of the following communes:
 
Arbourse
Arthel
Arzembouy
Beaumont-la-Ferrière
La Celle-sur-Nièvre
Champlemy
Champlin
Champvoux
La Charité-sur-Loire
Chasnay
Chaulgnes
Dompierre-sur-Nièvre
Giry
Lurcy-le-Bourg
La Marche
Montenoison
Moussy
Murlin
Nannay
Narcy
Oulon
Prémery
Raveau
Saint-Aubin-les-Forges
Saint-Bonnot
Sichamps
Tronsanges
Varennes-lès-Narcy

References

Cantons of Nièvre